Nicole Tubiola is an American actress. She is known for her role as Danielle "Dani" Davis on Wildfire (2005–2008). She has appeared in films Fired Up! (2009) and My Fake Fiance (2009).

Private life
Tubiola grew up in Bullhead City, Arizona and graduated in 1997 at Mohave High School. She married Wildfire co-star, actor Kieren Hutchison on August 10, 2003, and on September 5, 2007, she gave birth to a boy named Quinn.

Career
On April 19, 2009, Tubiola also starred in My Fake Fiancé as Courtney which aired on ABC Family. In 2012 she appeared on the New Zealand soap opera Shortland Street, playing drug and addiction counsellor "Rose Moore".

Filmography

References

External links

American film actresses
American television actresses
Living people
Place of birth missing (living people)
21st-century American women
Year of birth missing (living people)